Materyal is the first EP by Filipino rapper Shanti Dope, released on December 8, 2017 under Universal Records. Materyal has 5 tracks. The final track, Norem, also appeared in the Rotonda EP by Gloc-9. Aside from the song Norem, Gloc-9 is also featured in the song Shantidope.

Materyal won the Rap Album of the Year at the 10th PMPC Star Awards For Music.

The lead track of the EP, "Nadarang", won the Best Rap/Hip-hop Recording at the 31st Awit Awards.

Track listing

References 

2017 debut EPs
Universal Records (Philippines) albums
Shanti Dope albums